Elizabeth II, Queen of the United Kingdom and the Commonwealth realms died on 8 September 2022 at 15:10 BST. Following her death, Charles, Prince of Wales became Charles III, King of the United Kingdom and the Commonwealth realms. Several other changes in royal titles happened to members of the royal family.

Immediate changes 
The following is a list of changes to titles of members of the royal family between Elizabeth II's death and state funeral.

Later changes 
The following is a list of changes to titles of members of the royal family between Elizabeth II's state funeral and the Coronation of Charles III and Queen Camilla.

Notes

References 

British monarchy